The Roman Catholic Diocese of Azogues is a diocese located in the city of Azogues in the Ecclesiastical province of Cuenca in Ecuador. It was created on 26 June 1968 from territory of the Archdiocese of Cuenca by the papal bull made by Pope Paul VI.

Ordinaries
José Gabriel Diaz Cueva (26 Jun 1968 – 29 Apr 1975)
Raúl Eduardo Vela Chiriboga (29 Apr 1975 – 8 Jul 1989), appointed Bishop of Ecuador, Military; future Cardinal
Clímaco Jacinto Zarauz Carrillo (2 Mar 1990 – 14 Feb 2004)
Carlos Anibal Altamirano Argüello (14 Feb 2004 – 25 Sept 2015)
Oswaldo Patricio Vintimilla Cabrera (25 June 2016 - )

External links
 GCatholic.org
 Catholic Hierarchy

Roman Catholic dioceses in Ecuador
Roman Catholic Ecclesiastical Province of Cuenca
Christian organizations established in 1968
Roman Catholic dioceses and prelatures established in the 20th century